Andrew Cooke may refer to:
Andy Cooke (born 1974), British footballer
Andrew Cooke, banker and namesake of Cooke Dam
Andrew B. Cooke, original owner of the Andrew B. Cooke House in Virginia Beach

See also
Andrew Cook (disambiguation)